The Illinois PGA Championship is a golf tournament that is conducted by the Illinois PGA (Professional Golfers' Association). The 54-hole, stroke play Championship conducted over three days is the premier member event on the Illinois PGA calendar. The tournament is open to all "Class A" Illinois PGA Professionals in good standing with the PGA of America.

History
The first Illinois PGA Championship was held in 1922 and won by Eddie Loos. In addition to the first place purse money, the winner is awarded the Jim Kemper Cup, which was donated by Jim Kemper, the former president and chairman of the board of Kemper Insurance Company.

Method of play
The Illinois PGA Championship is a 54-hole stroke-play event. Following 36 holes of play, the field is cut to the low 50 scores plus ties. In the event of a tie for the Championship, there is a three-hole, total stroke playoff.  If the contestants remain tied after three (3) holes, the playoff will continue on a sudden death basis.

PGA Professional National Championship (PPNC) qualifying
The Illinois PGA Champion, along with a pre-determined number of finishers (based on total entries received), receive an exemption to play in the PGA Professional National Championship the following year.

Patriot Golf Day
During the first round of the Illinois PGA Championship, all competitors are asked to make a voluntary donation at registration in support of Patriot Golf Day – a joint initiative of the PGA of America and the United States Golf Association (USGA) that supports the Folds of Honor Foundation which provides post-secondary educational scholarships for children and spouses of military service men and women killed or disabled while serving our great nation. Contributions are also accepted through subsequent rounds.  At the conclusion of the Championship, the Illinois PGA matches all funds donated by its members.

Winners

 PO  = Won in playoff

Multiple winners
The following players have won the Illinois PGA Championship multiple times:

13 wins:
Mike Small – 2001, 2003, 2004, 2005, 2006, 2007, 2008, 2009, 2010, 2013, 2014, 2016, 2020
6 wins
Johnny Revolta – 1936, 1937, 1938, 1941, 1942, 1947
5 wins:
Bill Ogden – 1953, 1957, 1960, 1971, 1972
4 wins:
Jim Foulis – 1929, 1933, 1943, 1946
Gary Groh – 1983, 1986, 1989, 2002
3 wins:
Errie Ball – 1949, 1955, 1965
Steve Benson – 1982, 1984, 1994
Al Espinosa – 1927, 1928, 1930
Tony Holguin – 1954, 1962, 1970
Jock Hutchinson – 1923, 1925, 1926
Jim Sobb – 1995, 1999, 2000
Bob Zender – 1976, 1977, 1978
2 wins:
Bob Ackerman – 1988, 1993
Doug Bauman – 1996, 1997
Harry Cooper – 1932, 1934
Rick Dalpos – 1990, 1991
Bob Harris – 1959, 1961
Dick Hart – 1963, 1966
George Keyes - 1956, 1967
Eddie Loos – 1922, 1924
Chuck Malchaski – 1958, 1968

References

External links

PGA of America – Illinois Section

Golf in Illinois
PGA of America sectional tournaments